The Shaman's Heart II: The Healing Journey (2011) is the collaborative album by ambient musicians Byron Metcalf with Steve Roach, as guest. This is the second of Byron Metcalf's The Shaman's Heart series album, focused around a continuous "heartbeat" pace. Unlike the first volume, this disc contain ten seamless untitled tracks. The track numbers on the physical CD described as "way points" and not as individual tracks as on a typical CD. Produced, recorded, mixed & mastered at The Lair, Prescott, Arizona. Steve's elements recorded at the Timeroom, Southern Arizona.

Track listing

Personnel 
Adapted from Discogs
 Maud Wirström – artwork
 Steve Roach – composer, didgeridoo, ocarina, synthesizer, electronics, loops
 Byron Metcalf – composer, producer, recorder, mixing, mastering, drums, performer, frame drum, rattle, percussion, voice
 Sam Rosenthal – graphic design

References

External links 
 The Shaman's Heart II at Discogs

2011 albums
Steve Roach (musician) albums
Projekt Records albums